Rugulosin is an anthraquinoid mycotoxin with the molecular formula C30H22O10 which is produced by Penicillium species. Rugulosin is hepatotoxic and is cancerogenic.

References

Further reading 

 
 
 
 
 
 
 
 

Mycotoxins